Ryan Cunningham (born 29 May 1978 in Kingston, Jamaica) is a West Indian cricketer. He is a left-handed batsman and a left-arm spin bowler. He has played 29 first-class and eight List A matches, mainly for Jamaica. He represented Jamaica at the 1998 Commonwealth Games. He currently plays at Crouch End cricket club.

Cunningham has over 18 years of experience as a cricket coach coupled with 8 years playing first class cricket with and against arguably some of the best cricketers in the world. He describes his approach to coaching as 'dynamic, forward-thinking and player led'.

References
Cricket Archive profile
Cricinfo profile

1978 births
Sportspeople from Kingston, Jamaica
Jamaican cricketers
Jamaica cricketers
Cricketers at the 1998 Commonwealth Games
Commonwealth Games competitors for Jamaica
Living people